Menulog Pty. Ltd. (branded as simply Menulog) is an Australian and New Zealand online food and beverage ordering app and delivery service platform, headquartered and founded in Sydney in 2006. It was bought in 2015 by UK-based Just Eat, which was subsequently folded into Dutch-based Just Eat Takeaway.com in 2020, following Just Eat's acquisition.

The e-commerce company’s main competitors are United States-based Uber Eats and DoorDash. Menulog has over 30,000 restaurant partners across Australia and New Zealand and has its own couriers.

Restaurant partners 
Menulog includes international franchises like McDonald's, KFC, Pizza Hut, Subway and South African Portuguese chicken franchise Nando's. Whilst national franchises include Hungry Jack's, Red Rooster, Pizza Capers and Oporto, and also state and localised suburban restaurants offering more than 130 cuisines. Menulog operates in all major Australian states and cities.

Celebrity spokesmodels – Snoop Dogg and Katy Perry commercials 
The company is well-known through its television advertisements featuring musician Snoop Dogg titled "Did Somebody Say?", in which he raps about ways you can use the service, like ordering Fried Rice on a private jet or having Chocolate fondue delivered to your house.

Snoop Dogg was paid $US6.2 million for the adverts.

International pop music singer Katy Perry, is the latest star to front  a media campaign, through TV adverts 

Menulog also ran a commercial featuring Gerringong local rap act Big Twisty in 2022.

History

Menulog, based in Sydney, was founded by Dan Katz, Leon Kamenev and Kevin Sherman in 2006. Since its founding the company has handled over 22 million meal orders.

In 2007, the same year Menulog launched its first in-store ordering device, the business expanded to Australian cities Brisbane, Canberra and Melbourne. The following year, Menulog launched in Adelaide and Perth and expanded its reach further launching in New Zealand in 2012.

In 2009, Menulog launched its first iOS app and its first Android app in 2011.

In February 2015, Menulog and EatNow announced their agreement to merge with a 70/30 share split arrangement, forming Menulog Group Limited. In May 2015, the company was bought by Just Eat, which funded the deal by issuing new shares for 855 million Australian dollars.

In 2016, after reaching a ten million annual order milestone, Menulog lost its case against Pizza Fellas who successfully obtained interlocutory relief in the Victorian Civil and Administrative Tribunal (VCAT). The claim (VCAT 4345/2015) was brought by the Pizza Fellas Group who were granted Injunctive Relief to restrain Menulog from purchasing Google Adwords using Pizza Fellas' brandnames. Menulog's conduct, known as brandjacking had the effect of redirecting Pizza Fellas' customers to the Menulog website (so they could resell them back to the applicant Pizza Fellas).

The group  rebranded with a new logo and saw the appointment of former Groupon CEO Alistair Venn as managing director.

In 2019, Menulog's British parent company, Just Eat, agreed to merge with Amsterdam-based rival Takeaway.com in an £8.2 billion deal. Menulog is now a subsidiary of the combined corporation, Just Eat Takeaway.

By mid-2020, in the middle of the coronavirus pandemic where demand for services delivering food from restaurants and takeaways surged, Menulog announced it had received “a high volume” of requests to join its platform. The company said they had also implemented a range of measures to support both their drivers and restaurants on their platform, such as offering contactless delivery, and halved all commission on pickup orders until further notice.

Recognition and media

Menulog's research and insights into Australian food trends are regularly featured in the media, with a 2015 study showing Australia's hungriest suburbs published in The Daily Telegraph and The Herald Sun. Menulog's annual Tasty Takeaway awards, which recognise the nation's most popular takeaway restaurants, have appeared on news.com.au.

In October 2016, Menulog created Australia's first 23ct gold pizza in partnership with Pizza Design Co. Parramatta. The event was covered by Sunrise and Nine Kitchen.
Menulog was awarded the CANSTAR Blue Award for Customer Service in 2017.

At the 2017 CEO Magazine 'Executive of the Year' Awards, Menulog's CFO Morten Belling was named CFO of the Year and managing director Alistair Venn was named Runner-up in his respective category.

References

External links 

Online retailers of Australia
Companies based in Sydney
Online food ordering
Online companies of Australia